Sitamarhi Cave is an Indian artificial cave, and an important example of Indian rock-cut architecture. The cave is located 20 km south-west from Rajgir, 10 km south-west of Hisua, and dated to the Maurya empire. It was hewn in a huge hemispherical rock of granite.

The cave has the structure and "Mauryan polish" qualities of the Barabar caves, but without any inscription.  It is smaller than the Barabar caves, measuring only 4.91x3.43m, with a ceiling height of 2.01m. The entrance is also trapezoidal, as for the Barabar caves.

According to a later Hindu legend, the cave was built by the legendary builder Vishvakarman. This is also the cave is which Sita took refuge from Mara, hence the name of the cave.

The cave is sometimes considered as part of the "Rajgir group", together with Son Bhandar Caves.

References

Caves of Bihar
Mauryan art
History of Bihar
Indian rock-cut architecture
Archaeological sites in Bihar
3rd-century BC religious buildings and structures
Tourist attractions in Bihar
Artificial caves